The following highways are numbered 53:

Cambodia 
 National Road 53 (Cambodia)

Canada
 Alberta Highway 53

India
 National Highway 53 (India)

Ireland
 N53 road (Ireland)

Italy
 Autostrada A53

Japan
 Japan National Route 53

Korea, South
National Route 53 (South Korea)

Mexico
 Mexican Federal Highway 53

New Zealand
 New Zealand State Highway 53

Norway


Philippines
 N53 highway (Philippines)

Turkey
  , a motorway in Turkey connecting  with İskenderun, Hatay Province.

United Kingdom
 British A53 (Shrewsbury-Buxton)
 British M53 (Wallasey-Chester)

United States
 Interstate 53 (former proposal)
 U.S. Route 53
 Alabama State Route 53
 Arkansas Highway 53
 California State Route 53
 Colorado State Highway 53
 Connecticut Route 53
 Florida State Road 53
 County Road 53 (Lafayette County, Florida)
 County Road 53 (Madison County, Florida)
 Georgia State Route 53
 Idaho State Highway 53
 Illinois Route 53
 Indiana State Road 53
 Iowa Highway 53 (1926-1949) (former)
 K-53 (Kansas highway)
 Kentucky Route 53
 Louisiana Highway 53
 Louisiana State Route 53 (former)
 Maryland Route 53
 Massachusetts Route 53
 M-53 (Michigan highway)
 County Road 53 (Anoka County, Minnesota)
 County Road 53 (Hennepin County, Minnesota)
 County Road 53 (Ramsey County, Minnesota)
 Mississippi Highway 53
 Missouri Route 53
 Nebraska Highway 53
 Nebraska Link 53A
 Nebraska Link 53B
 Nebraska Link 53C
 Nebraska Link 53E
 Nevada State Route 53 (former)
 New Jersey Route 53
 County Route 53 (Bergen County, New Jersey)
 County Route 53 (Monmouth County, New Jersey)
 County Route 53 (Ocean County, New Jersey)
 New Mexico State Road 53
 New York State Route 53
 County Route 53 (Cattaraugus County, New York)
 County Route 53 (Chautauqua County, New York)
 County Route 53 (Delaware County, New York)
 County Route 53 (Dutchess County, New York)
 County Route 53 (Franklin County, New York)
 County Route 53 (Greene County, New York)
 County Route 53 (Jefferson County, New York)
 County Route 53 (Madison County, New York)
 County Route 53 (Monroe County, New York)
 County Route 53 (Montgomery County, New York)
 County Route 53 (Oneida County, New York)
 County Route 53 (Onondaga County, New York)
 County Route 53A (Onondaga County, New York)
 County Route 53 (Orange County, New York)
 County Route 53 (Orleans County, New York)
 County Route 53 (Otsego County, New York)
 County Route 53 (Putnam County, New York)
 County Route 53 (Rensselaer County, New York)
 County Route 53 (Rockland County, New York)
 County Route 53 (Saratoga County, New York)
 County Route 53 (Suffolk County, New York)
 County Route 53 (Sullivan County, New York)
 County Route 53 (Ulster County, New York)
 County Route 53A (Ulster County, New York)
 County Route 53 (Warren County, New York)
 County Route 53 (Westchester County, New York)
 County Route 53 (Wyoming County, New York)
 North Carolina Highway 53
 North Dakota Highway 53
 Ohio State Route 53
 Oklahoma State Highway 53
 Oklahoma State Highway 53A
 Oregon Route 53
 Pennsylvania Route 53
 South Carolina Highway 53
 South Dakota Highway 53
 Tennessee State Route 53
 Texas State Highway 53
 Texas State Highway Spur 53
 Farm to Market Road 53 (former)
 Texas Park Road 53 (former)
 Utah State Route 53
 Vermont Route 53
 Virginia State Route 53
 West Virginia Route 53
 West Virginia Route 53 (1920s) (former)
 Wisconsin Highway 53 (former)

Territories:
 Puerto Rico Highway 53